Augustus Alexander "Gus" Savage (October 30, 1925 – October 31, 2015) was an American entrepreneur, publisher and a Democratic member of the United States House of Representatives from Illinois.

Life and career
Savage was born in Detroit, Michigan, and graduated from Roosevelt University in Chicago. He served in the United States Army from 1943 to 1946 and then worked as a journalist from 1954 to 1979, owning a chain of weekly community newspapers in the Chicago area including the South End Citizen. The Chicago Citizen Newspaper Group became the largest Black-owned chain of weekly newspapers in the Midwest with a circulation of 121,000.

Savage entered political life in 1948 as a Progressive Party organizer.   He challenged the local establishment's chosen candidates for the House of Representatives in 1968 and 1970, losing the Democratic primary both times, but won election to the House in 1980, representing the 2nd District on Chicago's South Side for 6 terms, from January 1981 to January 1993.

In 1983 he joined with 7 other Congressional Representatives to sponsor a resolution to impeach Ronald Reagan over his sudden and unexpected invasion of Grenada.

In 1989, Savage was accused of trying to force himself on a female Peace Corps worker in Zaire. He denied the allegations and blamed them on the "racist press." The House Ethics Committee decided that the events did indeed occur, but it did not take disciplinary action only because Savage wrote a letter of apology.

Savage had long been controversial even in his own district. His racially incendiary and anti-Semitic remarks frequently drew bipartisan criticism. He never won a primary election–the real contest in this overwhelmingly Democratic district–with more than 52% of the vote, and usually faced multiple challengers.

For the 1992 election, redistricting pushed his district further into Chicago's south suburbs, territory that Savage did not know and that did not know him. He faced a rematch with Mel Reynolds, who had challenged him in the 1988 and 1990 primaries. Savage claimed that "racist Jews" were donating to Reynolds, while Reynolds claimed that Savage was involved in a drive-by shooting that injured him. Although Savage accused Reynolds of staging the shooting, he lost the 1992 election to Reynolds by a margin of 63%-37% after voters in the suburban portion of the district voted 4-to-1 for Reynolds.  In defeat Savage declared, "We have lost to the white racist press and to the racist reactionary Jewish misleaders."

In one of his final acts as chairman of the House Subcommittee on Public Buildings and Grounds, excavation and construction at the site of the African Burial Ground in New York City was temporarily halted in 1992, pending further evaluation by the General Services Administration, after Savage was able to leverage his reputation as a national political figure to bring attention to the potential importance of the site. The site was eventually designated a National Historic Landmark in 1993 and a National Monument in 2006 by President George W. Bush.

Savage died on October 31, 2015, one day after his 90th birthday, which he celebrated with his closest friends and family.  He is survived by his son Thomas Savage, daughter, Dr. Emma Savage, and grandchildren Thomas Savage Jr., Chyella McBride, and Alexandria Savage.

See also
List of African-American United States representatives

References

External links

 The New York Times Article archives on former Representative Gus Savage (135 articles).
Gus Savage at Congressional Bad Boys
 

1925 births
2015 deaths
African-American members of the United States House of Representatives
African-American United States Army personnel
African-American people in Illinois politics
United States Army personnel of World War II
American newspaper editors
Editors of Illinois newspapers
Politicians from Chicago
Politicians from Detroit
Roosevelt University alumni
United States Army soldiers
Democratic Party members of the United States House of Representatives from Illinois
20th-century American politicians
People from Olympia Fields, Illinois
Burials at Abraham Lincoln National Cemetery
African Americans in World War II